Daniel Lawrence Madwed (born March 15, 1989) is an American swimmer.

Career
Madwed was born in Stamford, Connecticut. 

He swam in the 2005 Maccabiah Games in Jerusalem, Israel. He won a gold medal and set a new Maccabiah Games record in the men's 200-meter butterfly.

He competed at the 2006 Pan Pacific Championships in Victoria, British Columbia, and was the youngest American male swimmer at the event. He placed 10th in the 200 m butterfly, 15th in the 100 m butterfly, and 15th in the 200 m individual medley.

In 2007, Madwed competed at the World University Games in Bangkok, where he won a gold medal as a part of the 4 × 200 m freestyle relay, a silver as a part of the 4 × 100 m medley relay, and a bronze in the 200 m butterfly.

At the 2008 US Olympic Trials in Omaha, Nebraska, Madwed placed 5th in the 200 m butterfly and 6th in the 200 m individual medley. Madwed also entered the 200 m freestyle, 400 m freestyle, and the 100 m butterfly. He did not advance past the preliminaries in those events.

At the 2009 US National Championships and World Championship Trials, Madwed placed second to Peter Vanderkaay in the 400 m freestyle with a time of 3:47.24, earning a place to compete at the 2009 World Aquatics Championships in Rome. At Nationals, Madwed also placed third in the 200 m butterfly final and 7th in the 200 m freestyle preliminaries. At the World Championships, Madwed placed ninth in the 400 m freestyle in 3:45.95, barely missing a place in the final. Madwed also competed in the preliminaries of the 4 × 200 m freestyle, where he swam the second leg in 1:45.63. The US won the gold medal in the final.

Personal
Madwed is an Industrial and Operations engineering Masters student at the University of Michigan and trains with Club Wolverine. Prior to attending Michigan, he swam with the North Baltimore Aquatic Club for two years.

Personal bests

References

External links
 
 
 

1989 births
Living people
American male freestyle swimmers
American male butterfly swimmers
Jewish American sportspeople
Jewish swimmers
Competitors at the 2005 Maccabiah Games
Maccabiah Games medalists in swimming
Maccabiah Games gold medalists for the United States
Michigan Wolverines men's swimmers
Sportspeople from Stamford, Connecticut
Swimmers at the 2011 Pan American Games
World Aquatics Championships medalists in swimming
Pan American Games gold medalists for the United States
Pan American Games medalists in swimming
Universiade medalists in swimming
Universiade gold medalists for the United States
Universiade silver medalists for the United States
Universiade bronze medalists for the United States
Medalists at the 2007 Summer Universiade
Medalists at the 2011 Pan American Games
21st-century American Jews